Scout spirit is an attitude that Scouts around the world are supposed to show, based on adherence to the ideals of Scouting. Scouting's founder, Baden Powell, once said, "The spirit is there in every boy; it has to be discovered and brought to light."

The Unknown Scout
This is the oft told story of the Unknown Scout used to exemplify Scout Spirit:

And so 51-year-old William D. Boyce, newspaper and magazine publisher from Chicago, Illinois, met the founder of the Boy Scout movement, the British military hero, Lieutenant-General Robert S. S. Baden-Powell, and learned about Scouting from the chief Scout himself.

On February 8, 1910, Boyce and a group of leaders founded the Boy Scouts of America. From that day forth, Scouts have celebrated February 8 as the birthday of Scouting in the United States.

In the British Scout Training Centre at Gilwell Park, England, Scouts from the United States erected a statue of an American Buffalo in honor of this unknown Scout. The statue is inscribed, "To the Unknown Scout Whose Faithfulness in the Performance of the Daily Good turn Brought the Scout Movement to the United States of America."

Boy Scouts of America

The Boy Scouts of America Mechanics of Advancement says:

Scoutmasters and Boards of Review must be careful in how they measure it:

The Scout's demonstration of Scout spirit is discussed at the Scoutmaster conference  and the board of review when the Scout advances to a new rank.

See also

 Scout method
 Scout Law
 Scout Motto
 Scout Oath
 Scout prayer
 Scout sign and salute

References

External links
  
  
 

Spirit